The Union Territory of Jammu and Kashmir has a better performance than the average in India with respect to Sustainable Development Goals indicators such as poverty, hunger, energy and climate action. However, with regard to indicators such as health, decent work, economic growth and education, the union territory performs worse than the national average. Other indicators for the UT such as female literacy and sex ratio is also lower than the national average.

In comparison with average for India

Sustainable Development Goals (2020-21) 

Notes:

Major Comparable indicators

References

Further reading

Good Governance Index 

Jammu and Kashmir